"Booby Trap" is the sixth episode of the third season of the American science fiction television series Star Trek: The Next Generation, the 54th episode overall, first broadcast on October 30, 1989. It is the first episode of any Star Trek series to be directed by a woman.

Set in the 24th century, the series follows the adventures of the Starfleet crew of the Federation starship Enterprise-D.  In this episode, the Enterprise discovers a derelict centuries-old alien battlecruiser.

Actress Susan Gibney guest stars as the spacecraft engineer Leah Brahms.

Plot
While the Federation starship Enterprise, under the command of Captain Jean-Luc Picard, investigates the asteroid-laden sector of space of the final battle between the Menthars and the Promellians, it receives a distress call from a Promellian battlecruiser; Captain Picard directs the ship to investigate. They find the ancient battlecruiser adrift but intact, and Picard, anxious to see the ship for himself, joins the away team as they transport over. They find the crew – all long dead, but still at their posts – while a recording by their captain suggests the ship was caught in a Menthar trap. With their investigation complete, the away team returns to the Enterprise to continue on, when they begin to suffer a series of power losses that prevent the use of either impulse or warp drive, and are bombarded by radiation that threatens to drain their shields and kill the crew. Picard orders Chief Engineer La Forge to find a way to restore power while a second away team searches for more clues on the Promellian vessel. They discover that the Menthars had previously used aceton assimilators to absorb an enemy ship's energy and redirect it back as hazardous radiation, and that the Enterprise is stuck in the same trap.

La Forge realizes that the only way to restore power is to reconfigure the warp drive, and traces the warp drive's design back to the Enterprises construction and blueprints created by Dr. Leah Brahms. La Forge enters the ship's holodeck to help figure through the engine reconfiguration, whereupon the computer takes an off the cuff remark by Geordi literally and creates a holographic representation of Brahms herself to assist him in his work. As Geordi does so, he asks the computer to update the hologram with Dr. Brahms' personality profile, and slowly gains romantic feelings for her. Despite the holo-Brahms' help, La Forge is unable to find a way to safely maneuver the Enterprise away, and when Picard orders all extraneous power systems (including the holodeck) shut down to conserve power, La Forge convinces the captain to allow the holodeck to continue to run.

After power is restored, the simulated Dr. Brahms recognizes a solution which is to allow the computer to take control of the ship, allowing it to make rapid adjustments to compensate for the trap. La Forge then finds an alternate solution to the problem, which is to completely reduce the power output from the Enterprise and maneuver it out of the field by manual control with only two thrusters. Picard and La Forge decide that computers cannot account for human intuition and elect to go with the manual approach. Picard takes the helm himself to carry out the operation, successfully moving the Enterprise from the trap. Once free and with power restored, the Enterprise destroys the Promellian craft to prevent others from falling into the trap.

Releases 
The episode was released with Star Trek: The Next Generation season three DVD box set, released in the United States on July 2, 2002. This had 26 episodes of Season 3 on seven discs, with a Dolby Digital 5.1 audio track. It was released in high-definition Blu-ray in the United States on April 30, 2013.

This was released in Japan on LaserDisc on July 5, 1996, in the half season set Log. 5: Third Season Part.1 by CIC Video. This included episodes up to  "A Matter of Perspective" on 12-inch double-sided optical discs. The video was in NTSC format with both English and Japanese audio tracks.

Reception 

Keith DeCandido gave the episode a rating of 4 out of 10 for Tor.com, writing "There’s a lot of good in this episode—Picard's archaeological geekiness, the simplicity of both the trap and the ultimate solution, the nobility of the Promellian captain, the whole ships-in-bottles bit", but found it impossible to rate highly due to the inherent creepiness in the premise of LaForge falling in love with a computer simulation of a real person.

In a review of this episode in 2010, The A.V. Club gave the episode a "B" grade, writing, "The big climax shifts entirely to Picard's shoulders, as he takes over the helm to pilot the Enterprise out of the debris field. It's the best part of the episode, and a comforting ... reminder that by now in the show's run, even when things threaten to go off course, there's always a steady hand to get us back on track.

Io9s 2014 listing of the top 100 Star Trek episodes placed "Booby Trap" as the 90th best episode of all series up to that time, out of over 700 episodes.
In 2019, Comic Book Resources rated "Booby Trap" the 14th best 'holodeck' episode of the franchise.

In 2019, Den of Geek noted this episode for featuring romantic elements with Geordi.

In 2017, Popular Mechanics said that "Booby Trap" was one of the top ten most fun episodes of Star Trek: The Next Generation, noting that it has several unique plot concepts, including ancient space traps, falling in love with a hologram, and that technology may not solve all problems.

In 2020, ScreenRant noted this as a frightening episode of Star Trek, elaborating "... It ends in nail-biting, spectacular fashion." and conclude it has one of the best moments for Captain Picard (played by Patrick Stewart).

See also

 "Galaxy's Child" - the fourth season episode where the real Leah Brahms comes aboard the Enterprise.

References

External links

 

Star Trek: The Next Generation (season 3) episodes
1989 American television episodes
Holography in television